The National Hockey Super League (NHSL) is a professional ice hockey league based in Australia. Started in November 2021, it is the first professional ice hockey league in Australia.

The league was formally announced on the 16th of September, with three founding teams to start the league. All three teams are based in Adelaide, and all games will be played in the IceArenA.

Teams

Expansion
In its first year, NHSL features three teams made up of predominantly South Australian-based players. The league has plans to expand to a national format in 2022, with the goal to have 15 teams nationwide by 2023.

References

Sports leagues established in 2021
Professional sports leagues in Australia
Ice hockey leagues in Australia
2021 establishments in Australia
Ice hockey in Australia